(from ,  "science or learning", and  "universal") is a hypothetical universal science modelled on mathematics envisaged by Descartes and Leibniz, among a number of other 16th- and 17th-century philosophers and mathematicians. For Leibniz, it would be supported by a calculus ratiocinator. John Wallis invokes the name as title in his Opera Mathematica, a textbook on arithmetic, algebra, and Cartesian geometry.

History 

Descartes' most explicit description of mathesis universalis occurs in Rule Four of the Rules for the Direction of the Mind, written before 1628. Leibniz attempted to work out the possible connections between mathematical logic, algebra, infinitesimal calculus, combinatorics, and universal characteristics in an incomplete treatise titled "Mathesis Universalis" in 1695.

Predicate logic could be seen as a modern system with some of these universal qualities, at least as far as mathematics and computer science are concerned. More generally, mathesis universalis, along with perhaps François Viète's algebra, represents one of the earliest attempts to construct a formal system.

One of the perhaps most prominent critics of the idea of mathesis universalis was Ludwig Wittgenstein and his philosophy of mathematics. As Anthropologist Emily Martin notes:

René Descartes 
In Descartes' corpus the term mathesis universalis appears only in the Rules for the Direction of the Mind. In the discussion of Rule Four, Descartes' provides his clearest description of mathesis universalis:

Gottfried Leibniz 
In his account of mathesis universalis, Leibniz proposed a dual method of universal synthesis and analysis for the ascertaining truth, described in De Synthesi et Analysi universale seu Arte inveniendi et judicandi (1890).

Ars inveniendi 
Ars inveniendi (Latin for "art of invention") is the constituent part of mathesis universalis corresponding to the method of synthesis. Leibniz also identified synthesis with the ars combinatoria, viewing it in terms of the recombination of symbols or human thoughts.

Ars judicandi 
Ars judicandi (Latin for "art of judgement") is the constituent part of mathesis universalis corresponding to the method of analysis.

Michel Foucault 
In The Order of Things, Michel Foucault discuses mathesis as the conjunction point in the ordering of simple natures and algebra, paralleling his concept of taxinomia. Though omitting explicit references to universality, Foucault uses the term to organise and interpret all of human science, as is evident in the full title of his book: "The Order of Things: An Archaeology of the Human Sciences".

See also

References

Bibliography

External links 
 Raul Corazzon's Ontology web page: Mathesis Universalis with a bibliography

Mathematical logic
Gottfried Wilhelm Leibniz
René Descartes
Intellectual history
History of logic
History of mathematics
Michel Foucault
Philosophy of mathematics
Philosophy of science
Latin words and phrases